The Annual International (bio)Medical Students Meeting, also known as AIMS Meeting, is an annually held student congress on biomedical sciences, considered to be the largest European Biomedical Conference organized entirely by medical students. It is essentially advocated by the Faculty of Medicine of the Lisbon Students’ Local Committee and highlights the importance of medical education for all students of health sciences through a diverse approach. In 2021, despite numerous travel restrictions across the world, more than 1300 participants from 19 countries were able to attend its Online Edition (and in-person workshops), proving to be one of the hallmarks of medical education for (bio)medical students across the globe, particularly in a year where the vast majority of students were forced to partake in exclusive online classes.

History 
Founded in 2009, AIMS Meeting was first recognized by ENJOY Med and was attended essentially by medical students. By the 3rd edition, the congress expanded internationally and became directed to a broader public, now being meant for all students attending biomedical sciences courses. Since its conception, AIMS Meeting has steadily increased its visibility and dimension, being known for its exquisite quality of Lectures, frequently composed of Nobel Prize Winners in Chemistry, Peace or Physiology or Medicine.

9th Edition | March 16th - 18th 2018 
3 Days

750 Participants

119 International Participants from 18 Countries and 4 continents

67 Workshops

10th Edition | March 14th - 17th 2019 
4 Days

941 Participants

119 International Participants from 35 Countries and 4 continents

87 workshops

3 Nobel Prizes as Keynote Lectures  - Harald Zur Hausen, Peter Agre and Aaron Ciechanover.

11th Edition | March 26th - 29th 2020 | Cancelled due to Covid-19 Pandemic 
4 Days

1250 Participants

200 International Participants from 26 Countries and 4 Continents

100 Workshops

AIMS Meeting 2021 | March 18th - 21st 2021 
General Coordination by Guilherme Vilhais and Inês Mendo

4 Days, with three thematic modules: Global Health Threats: A Ticking Clock; Life's Commander: Understanding the Brain; and Ongoing Evolution: Enhance and Restore.

1346 Virtual Participants

54 International Participants from 19 Countries and 4 Continents

84 Workshops with over 2000 available vacancies

Renowned Lecturers included Nobel Peace Prize Laureate Jonathan Patz, Nobel in Physiology or Medicine Prize Laureate Jules Hoffmann and Rosalind Picard.

AIMS Meeting 2022 | March 10th - 13th 2022 
General Coordination by Joana de Pona Ferreira

4 Days, with three thematic modules: Reaching Balance: Nature vs Nurture; Custom-Made: Tailored Healthcare; and The Day After: A New Beginning.

1100 Participants, both on-site and virtual

54 International Participants from 19 Countries and 4 Continents

127 Workshops with over 2000 available vacancies

Renowned panellists included Keynote Lecturers Henry Marsh, and Nobel in Physiology or Medicine Prize Laureates John O'Keefe and Brian Kobilka.

AIMS Meeting 2023 | 13th - 16th of April 2023 
General Coordination by Beatriz Figueiredo and Diogo Vianez Oliveira

4 Days, with three thematic modules: World Within Us: Shaped by Environment; Beating All Odds: Impossible Diseases; and Without Borders: Outside The Box.

Location 

AIMS Meeting takes place at the Aula Magna of the University of Lisbon (UL), in Portugal. The congress' workshops are also held on other places, such at the Hospital de Santa Maria, one of Portugal's biggest academic hospitals, or at the Instituto de Medicina Molecular, an associated research centre internationally recognised for its focus on topics like human genome and immunotherapy.

Congress Structure 
The congress is usually concerned with conceptual and thematic innovation. Each of its 4 days of lectures is usually dedicated to a module, so that every lecture is dedicated to a specific concept and lecturers may have the opportunity to exchange their ideas between them and the audience during the roundtables. The congress is for (bio)medical students who are interested in research. Students may be either presenting or non-presenting participants. If a participant wants to present their research, they are required to submit their abstract beforehand. The congress also offers practical learning opportunities through its workshops and a social program, designed to get to know Lisbon.

Organising Committee 

The AIMS Meeting Organising Committe is composed entirely by college students from the Faculty of Medicine of the University of Lisbon.
Its structure consists of four departments: Scientific Department; Logistics and Fundraising Department; Image and Communication Department; and Public Relations Department.
Each department has coordinators, and the whole Organizing Committee is lead by two General Coordinators.

Prizes and Awards 
The European Medical Students' Association (EMSA) distinguished the 10th AIMS Meeting as "The Most Innovative Project" at the Autumn Assembly 2019, held in Athens, Greece from September 1 to September 6 and under the theme "A medical Curriculum shaped by Medical Students".

The 11th AIMS Meeting has joined the IFMSA (International Federation of Medical Students' Association) Health Systems.

The 11th AIMS Meeting has achieved the high patronage of the President of the Portuguese Republic.

AIMS Meeting 2022 has achieved the high patronage of the President of the Portuguese Republic.

References

External links 
AIMS Meeting Official Website

Academic conferences
Congresses